Monodiamesa is a genus of midges in the non-biting midge family (Chironomidae).

Species
M. alpicola (Brundin, 1952)
M. bathyphila (Kieffer, 1918)
M. bonalpicola Han & Tang, 2021
M. depectinata Sæther, 1973
M. ekmani (Brundin, 1949)
M. prolilobata Sæther, 1973
M. secunditibetica Han & Tang, 2021
M. tuberculata Sæther, 1973

References

Chironomidae